Karel Vejmelka (born 25 May 1996) is a Czech professional ice hockey goaltender for the Arizona Coyotes of the National Hockey League (NHL). Vejmelka was selected by the Nashville Predators in the fifth round (145th overall) of the 2015 NHL Entry Draft.

Playing career
Vejmelka made his Czech Extraliga debut playing with HC Pardubice debut during the 2014–15 Czech Extraliga season. He was selected in the fifth-round, 145th overall, by the Nashville Predators in the 2015 NHL Entry Draft.

During the 2015–16 season, after making just a solitary appearance with Dynamo, Vejmelka transferred his contract to fellow ELH club, HC Kometa Brno, on 28 November 2015.

With a shortened loan to HC Dukla Jihlava, Vejmelka, un-signed by the Predators, played the next five seasons with HC Kometa Brno before he was signed as a free agent to a one-year entry-level contract with the Arizona Coyotes of the NHL on 5 May 2021.

In his debut North American season, Vejmelka earned a roster spot with the Coyotes to begin the  season. He made his NHL debut with the Coyotes, stopping 32 of 33 shot attempts in a 2–1 shootout loss to the Buffalo Sabres on 17 October 2021. With injury to initial starting goaltender Carter Hutton, Vejmelka assumed a larger role and established himself in the league. On 21 March 2022, the Coyotes signed Vejmelka to a three-year, $8.175 million contract extension that carries a $2.725 million cap hit.

Career statistics

Regular season and playoffs

International

References

External links
 

1996 births
Living people
Arizona Coyotes players
Czech expatriate ice hockey players in the United States
Czech ice hockey goaltenders
HC Dukla Jihlava players
HC Dynamo Pardubice players
SK Horácká Slavia Třebíč players
HC Kometa Brno players
Nashville Predators draft picks
Sportspeople from Třebíč